Dirk Pieter Spierenburg was a Dutch politician and diplomat. He was born on 4 February 1909 in Rotterdam (Netherlands and died on 27 August 2001. He was a member of the High Authority of the European Coal and Steel Community, serving in the Monnet Authority from 1952 and was in charge of external relations. He later wrote the Spierenburg report on reform in 1979 of the European Commission which was only partly heeded.

1909 births
2001 deaths
20th-century Dutch diplomats
Dutch European Commissioners
Politicians from Rotterdam
Members of the High Authority of the European Coal and Steel Community
Diplomats from Rotterdam